You Have the Right to Remain Silent may refer to:

 "You have the right to remain silent", the opening of the Miranda warning given to criminal suspects in the United States

Music
 You Have the Right to Remain Silent... (album), a 1995 album by X-Cops
 You Have the Right to Remain Silent (EP), a 1980 EP by The Radiators
 "You Have the Right to Remain Silent" (song), a 1995 song by Perfect Stranger

See also
 Right to silence, a legal principle which confers the right to refuse to answer questions from law enforcement officers or court officials